The Lighting Industry Association is Europe's largest trade association for lighting equipment professionals. This includes lighting manufacturers, suppliers, retailers, wholesalers, designers and all professionals active in the UK lighting market.

History
The NEW Lighting Industry Association was formed on 1 January 2012 from the merging of the Lighting Industry Federation and the Lighting Association.

Function
The Lighting Industry Association’s mission is to strengthen the industry and promote the benefits of good quality lighting by representing all aspects of UK, EU and international legislation and standards at the highest level whilst protecting the interests of both the public and members.

Lighting Association Laboratory
The LIA laboratories are United Kingdom Accreditation Service (UKAS) accredited and the UK's main (or only) lighting testing (in a scientific manner) service. It tests lights to the main British Standard, BS EN 60598.

Student Lighting Awards
It hosts an awards for university (or art college) students involved in lighting, sponsored by companies such as Osram, Anglepoise and Dar Lighting

Structure
It is based in Telford. The LIA employs around over 30 full-time staff.

External links
 Lighting Industry Association
 LA Labs
 ICEL
 Accredited Builders

Construction organizations
Trade associations based in the United Kingdom
Lighting